DD 214 or DD-214 may refer to:

 DD Form 214, United States military discharge document
 USS Tracy (DD-214), a United States Navy destroyer in service 1919 to 1946